The Grasset Editions is a French publishing house founded in 1907 by  (1881–1955).

History

Founder
In 1913, Bernard Grasset publishes the first volume of À la recherche du temps perdu, by Marcel Proust, Du côté de chez Swann, without reading it, and in 1920, André Maurois, François Mauriac, Henry de Montherlant, Paul Morand (called the 4 M) and later on: Raymond Radiguet, Blaise Cendrars, André Malraux, Pierre Drieu la Rochelle, Fernand de Brinon, Jacques Doriot, Abel Bonnard, Jacques Chardonne, Georges Blond and Adolf Hitler. He is condemned, in 1945, for his collaboration with the nazis and receives Electroconvulsive therapy in Ville-d'Avray, for mental illness.

Publishing house
In 1959, Bernard Privat merge the  éditions Fasquelle with Grasset. Jean-Claude Fasquelle becomes also the director of the Magazine Littéraire, in 1970.

In 1975, Grasset's literary director, Yves Berger also Pierre Sabbagh's cultural adviser on the 2nd channel of French television, convinces Jacqueline Baudrier in charge of the 1st channel to replace Marc Gilbert's Italics with Bernard Pivot's Ouvrez les guillemets talk show.

In 1982, La Violence et le sacré, by René Girard, recognized the merit of nazi philosopher Carl Schmitt.

From 1981 to 2005, Lucien Bodard, Dominique Fernandez, Amin Maalouf, Patrick Rambaud, Pascal Quignard, François Weyergans, published by Grasset, win the Prix Goncourt. Jean-Marie Rouart, Raphaële Billetdoux, François Weyergans, Pascal Bruckner, Dominique Bona, Daniel Picouly, Frédéric Beigbeder, Virginie Despentes, Yann Moix, Olivier Guez, win the Prix Renaudot, from 1984 to 2017.

Antisemitism

Post-revisionism
In 2000,  is the new director and publishes the controversial philosopher Michel Onfray dedicating his Traité d"athéologie (2005) to Raoul Vaneigem, who defended holocaust denier's freedom of speech, supported by Robert Ménard and Dieudonné M'bala M'bala, Histoires de saisons (2006), by Jean Pierre Fleury, former assistant of Pierre-André Boutang married to Grasset's editor Martine Ferrand and publisher of holocaust denier and post-revisionism's founder with Alain Guionnet, pedophile described by Roland Jaccard, Olivier Mathieu, Virginie Despentes, criticized for complacency towards Charlie Hebdo shooting's authors, and called the "scavenger of January 7, 2015", Autopsie, by Mehdi Meklat, accused of antisemtism and negrophobia or Laurent Joly's analysis of post-revisionism, in La falsification de l'Histoire (2022).

In 2019, L'Express revealed documents, that Yann Moix participated in 1989 and 1990, when he was a student, at age 21, in three issues of Ushoahia, a "home-made magazine" holocaust denial inspired by Post-revisionism, conveying anti-Semitism as well as virulent racism against blacks, Le Monde reports that at Grasset, directed by Yves Berger, Yann Moix's publishing house, three people were aware of the incriminated publications: Bernard-Henri Lévy, Jean-Paul Enthoven and the CEO Olivier Nora. In 2022, The jesters of hatred, by Thomas Nlend, reveals how a black man became a police informant concerning Alain Soral, condemned for apology of crime against humanity, holocaust denial and supporter of Matzneff.; and DAFT, by Pauline Guéna, Anne-Sophie Jahn, about retro-futurist electro-pop DJ's, Daft Punk, whose grandfather was Francisco Manuel Homem Cristo Filho, co-founder of the fascist stare, Estado Novo.

Three famous novels
  of François Nourissier, Grand prix du roman de l'Académie française)
 Du côté de chez Swann of Marcel Proust, published at author's expense
  of Edmonde Charles-Roux, Prix Goncourt

See also
 Books in France

References

External links
 

Gallimard
French brands